Richard Boivin is a justice serving on the Federal Court of Appeal since 2014. He has previously served as Associate Senior General Counsel with the Aboriginal Affairs Portfolio for the Canadian Department of Justice.

References

Judges of the Federal Court of Appeal (Canada)